The Coupe de la Ligue Final 2000 was a football match held at Stade de France, Saint-Denis on 22 April 2000, that saw FC Gueugnon of Division 2 defeat Paris Saint-Germain FC 2–0 thanks to goals by Marcelo Trapasso and Sylvain Flauto.

Match details

See also
1999–2000 Coupe de la Ligue

External links
Match report at LFP

2000
FC Gueugnon matches
Paris Saint-Germain F.C. matches
1999–2000 in French football
April 2000 sports events in France
Sport in Saint-Denis, Seine-Saint-Denis
Football competitions in Paris
2000 in Paris